Results for the Quarterfinals  of the 2011–12 Euroleague basketball tournament.

The quarterfinals will be played from March 22 to April 6, 2012. Team #1 (i.e., the group winner in each series) hosts Games 1 and 2, plus Game 5 if necessary. Team #2 hosts Game 3, plus Game 4 if necessary.

All times are CET (UTC+1).

Quarterfinal 1

Game 1

Game 2

Game 3

Game 4

Quarterfinal 2

Game 1

Game 2

Game 3

Game 4

Quarterfinal 3

Game 1

Game 2

Game 3

Game 4

Game 5

Quarterfinal 4

Game 1

Game 2

Game 3

External links
Schedule

Quarterfinals